Thanatos, Drunk is a 2015 Taiwanese drama film directed by Chang Tso-chi. It was screened in the Panorama section of the 65th Berlin International Film Festival.

Plot
Rat and his elder gay brother Shanghe live in an old house on the fringe of Taipei City. Rat works at a market vegetable stall and goes out with a mute woman who gets up to all sorts of craziness. Shanghe works for an entertainment company and dances in a gay nightclub. He is attracted to his cousin's boyfriend, Shuo, who is a gigolo. Shuo gets beaten up by his ex-client's brother, Ah Xiang, and his men at the behest of his sister. Ah Xiang, out for revenge because of a scar left by Rat, uses Rat's mute girlfriend to catch him. When alone with Ah Xiang, he attacks and stabs him suddenly with a hooked knife that he keeps around in his sling bag. Back at his home after escaping from Ah Xiang, he remembers the incident when he found his decomposing mother's corpse on the floor of her home. The movie ends with a silhouette of him hugging his mother at the river bank.

Cast
Lee Hong-chi as Rat
Cheng Jen-shuo as Shuo
Huang Shang-ho as Shanghe
Lü Hsueh-feng as Mother
Wang Ching-tingas Da-xiong
Chang Ning as The Mute
Lin Chin-yu as Ah Xiang
Andrew Chen 		
Chin Tzu-yen as Zi-yan

Accolades

References

External links
 

2015 films
2015 drama films
Taiwanese drama films
Taiwanese-language films
2010s Mandarin-language films
Taiwanese LGBT-related films
2015 LGBT-related films
LGBT-related drama films